Ellie Roebuck (born 23 September 1999) is an English professional footballer who plays as a goalkeeper for Women's Super League club Manchester City and the England national team. She has also represented England at youth level.

Club career
Roebuck started her career at Sheffield United's centre of excellence, before leaving to join Manchester City, aged 15.

In January 2018, Roebuck signed her first professional contract with Manchester City. A month later, she made her senior breakthrough from the development squad, due to an early injury to Karen Bardsley, keeping a clean sheet in a 0–0 league draw against Chelsea. On 23 May 2019, Roebuck, having been part of the side that won both the FA Cup and League Cup, extended her contract with Manchester City for another two years. At the end of the 2019–20 season, Roebuck was awarded the inaugural Barclays FA WSL Golden Glove having kept ten clean sheets in 16 league appearances.

Roebuck missed much of the 2021–22 season with a calf injury, limiting her to 10 league appearances out of 22, her lowest since 2017. In addition she missed several international fixtures.

International career
Roebuck was part of the England squad that won bronze medal in the 2018 U20 World Cup in France, however, she was an unused substitute in all the fixtures.

In October 2018, England manager Phil Neville named Roebuck and Manchester City team-mate Georgia Stanway in his squad for the first time. Roebuck made her senior team debut as a 79th minute substitute for Mary Earps on 8 November 2018 against Austria. She made her first start, before being replaced by Earps at half time, in a 2–1 win against Spain on 9 April 2019.

On 27 May 2021 it was announced that Roebuck had been selected as one of the two goalkeepers in the Great Britain women's Olympic football team for the 2020 Olympics. She made her debut on 21 July 2021 in a 2–0 win against Chile. In June 2022, Roebuck was included in the England squad which won UEFA Women's Euro 2022.

Personal life
Roebuck was born in Sheffield and grew up as a Sheffield United supporter. Whilst at City, she attended Connell Sixth Form College to complete a sports qualification.

Career statistics

Club
.

International
Statistics accurate as of match played 6 September 2022.

Honours
Manchester City
 FA Women's Super League: 2016
 Women's FA Cup: 2016–17, 2018–19, 2019–20
 FA Women's League Cup: 2016, 2018–19, 2021–22

England

UEFA Women's Championship: 2022
Arnold Clark Cup: 2022, 2023

England U20
FIFA U-20 Women's World Cup third place: 2018

Individual
 Barclays FA WSL Golden Glove: 2019–20
Freedom of the City of London (announced 1 August 2022)

References

External links

 Profile at the Manchester City F.C. website
 Profile at the Football Association website
 
 

Living people
1999 births
Footballers from Sheffield
English women's footballers
England women's youth international footballers
England women's international footballers
Olympic footballers of Great Britain
Women's association football goalkeepers
Women's Super League players
Manchester City W.F.C. players
Sheffield United W.F.C. players
Footballers at the 2020 Summer Olympics
UEFA Women's Euro 2022 players
UEFA Women's Championship-winning players